Ilya Kaznadey (born June 22, 1989) is a Belarusian ice hockey player who is currently playing for HK Neman Grodno of the (BXL).

Kaznadey competed in the 2013 IIHF World Championship as a member of the Belarus men's national ice hockey team.

References

1989 births
Living people
Belarusian ice hockey defencemen
HC Dinamo Minsk players
Metallurg Zhlobin players
Ice hockey people from Minsk
Universiade medalists in ice hockey
Universiade silver medalists for Belarus
Competitors at the 2011 Winter Universiade